Anthony Bottrall (15 May 1938 – 16 December 2014) was a British diplomat, expert in developmental agriculture and a Liberal Democrat, Lambeth London Borough Council, Stockwell ward politician.

He stood against incumbent Labour MP Kate Hoey at the 2001 United Kingdom general election in the seat of Vauxhall, finishing second.

He was the son of the poet Ronald Bottrall.

References

1938 births
2014 deaths
British diplomats
Liberal Democrats (UK) councillors
Councillors in the London Borough of Lambeth